The St James Theatre is a heritage stage theatre and cinema located near Queen Street in Auckland, New Zealand. Built in 1928, it was a replacement for the older Fuller's Opera House and was originally designed for vaudeville acts. Its architect Henry Eli White also designed many other famous theatres in Australia and New Zealand including the St James Theatre in Wellington and the State Theatre in Sydney.

The theatre has been closed since 2007 after a fire raised concerns about safety and compliance. Purchased by Relianz Holdings in 2014, it is a restoration project with an Auckland Council contribution of $15 million. Buildings on the adjacent sites were demolished by late-2016 to make way for the St James Suites, a 39-level, 309-apartment project. However, in July 2019, no work had been done on the theatre since 2015 after funding for the apartment complex was lost.

The theatre is classified as a "Category I" ("places of special or outstanding historical or cultural heritage significance or value") historic place by the New Zealand Historic Places Trust.

Construction
The St James Theatre was commissioned by John Fuller and Sons Limited to replace Fuller's Opera House which burned down in 1926. The site on Queen Street opposite Civic Square was acquired for around £100,000; construction of the theatre was estimated to cost around £80,000. Construction was completed in 1928, and the theatre was originally targeted for the performance of vaudeville acts. Upon its completion, the eldest brother of the Fuller family, Sir Benjamin Fuller, pronounced St James to be "the theatre perfect". The theatre's grand opening was on 5 July 1928 with the London Musical Company performing Archie.

The St. James Theatre was designed by architect Henry Eli White for its owners Sir Benjamin Fuller and his brother John Fuller. White was responsible for a number of theatres in Australia and New Zealand, including the St. James Theatre, Sydney. This was also built for the Fullers, who owned a significant theatre and retail businesses across the two countries.

At the time the St. James was designed, live performance was dominated by vaudeville: musical and comic entertainment. The St. James was quickly adapted to the newly popular ‘talking pictures’ however, with the addition of a film projector 18 months after opening. The St. James has accommodated live performance and/or film during different periods of its lifetime.

Renovations
The St James has undergone several major modifications since its construction. A year after it was finished, cinema projectors were added due to the popularity of cinema. Cinema was to become a major part of the St James; its first film screening was Gold Diggers of Broadway, shown on Boxing Day 1929.

In 1953, the building's facade and vestibule underwent renovation for the visit of Queen Elizabeth II, who attended a cinema premiere screening in December of that year. As part of the renovations, the unique facade was hidden behind sheets of metal in an attempt to give the building a more modern look.

However, its Spanish-Renaissance style interior is well preserved. The main auditorium has three tiers of seating plus boxes, elaborate lighting and ornate plasterwork decoration; items of heritage value include statuettes, the terrazzo flooring and the grand marble staircase.

In 1957, the Odeon Cinema with 670 seats was added to the theatre complex. In 1966 further modifications were made to the Queen Street facade; in 1966 the Westend Cinema was added, the Regent Theatre was added in 1982.

Use and notable performers
While active, the theatre hosted many famous performers such as theatrical actors Laurence Olivier, Vivien Leigh and Ralph Richardson. The Black and White Minstrel Show performed in 1963. In 1972 the successful West End musical play Charlie Girl performed at the St James with its original cast. The 1981 Royal Command Performance was held at St James for the visiting Queen Elizabeth II, Sir Howard Morrison held a premier performance of his te reo Māori version of the song How Great Thou Art that launched his commercial success.

Closure, proposals and restoration project
In 2007, a fire damaged the theatre and it has not been open to the public since then. Any new work to restore the building would require earthquake proofing according to Auckland City Council's building standards, adding to the cost of any future restoration of the theatre. A 39-storey apartment building next to the theatre was approved by Auckland City Council in 2009. The owner of the St James and the developer behind the planned construction, Paul Doole, stated that the cost to restore and to reopen the theatre was estimated to be around $50 million.

A 2010 proposal was for the St. James to be restored as part of a new Convention Centre. (Brian Rudman, ‘St James Theatre restoration would be sweet music to the ears of many’. New Zealand Herald, 9 August 2010, pA7).

In 2014, the theatre was purchased by Relianz Holdings who confirmed plans to restore it and build the St James Suites apartments on the adjacent site by as early as 2018, but by July 2019 repairs were at a standstill after a bank withdrew $90 million worth of funding for the apartment complex. The theatre was to have made use of access routes and public conveniences in the complex, and restoration work cannot proceed until these issues are addressed.

Historical significance
The St James building is classified as a "Category I" ("places of special or outstanding historical or cultural heritage significance or value") historic place by the New Zealand Historic Places Trust. Excerpts from the Historic Places Trust register read as follows:

The St James has been a major focus of social life in Auckland for the best part of a century. It has been the venue for many important cinematic and theatrical events held for many royal and important occasions.

Norman Hayward, manager from 1935, came from a strong family background of theatre and cinema. Under Hayward the theatrical atmosphere of the St James was enhanced, the patrons were entertained by piano playing in the foyer during the interval and informed by the weekly newsreels, entitled 'The St James Airmail Review'. During this period Fullers picked up the Metro-Goldwyn-Mayer contract and the St James became the MGM theatre of Auckland.

In 1945, Kerridge Theatres Ltd bought all Fuller cinemas, including the St James. With Kerridge came the return of stage shows, including, from overseas, Charlie Girl, a West End production brought over in its entirety, the Bolshoi Ballet Company, and New Zealand shows, the Royal Variety Performance, and the New Zealand Ballet Company, amongst others. The large seating capacity has made it economic to bring large shows to Auckland for the last fifty years. Of all the Queen Street theatres built for live shows, the St James is the only remaining one.

St James Saviours
The St James Saviours is a lobby group formed in 2010 by Bob Kerridge, the son of ex-owner of the St James, Sir Robert Kerridge.  Members include Judi Dench, Ian McKellen, Alan Bennett and over 7,000 supporters on Facebook.

Patron of the St James Saviours is Auckland Mayor Len Brown, who in early 2011 commissioned a study to identify the need and market demand for professional performing arts venues in Auckland, and to help guide Auckland Council's investment in such venues over the next 10 to 15 years.

In September 2012 David Hartnell MNZM was named Ambassador of the St James Saviours.

References

External links

 St James Saviours Facebook Page
 Haunted Auckland
 St James Theatre Historical Photo Gallery NZ Herald
 St James Listing in the NZ Historic Places Trust Register
 David Hartnell's Bid to Save Iconic St James Theatre, Fairfax News June 2013
 Scott Kara : Let's Revive the St James, NZ Herald July 2013
 Fate of an Auckland Landmark: Saving the St James, NZ Herald August 2013
 Perfect City Venue for Live Shows and Music, NZ Herald August 2013
 Campaign Aims to Restore Lost Glory, NZ Herald August 2013
 Margot McRae: St James is our Albert Hall - all it needs is a WOF, NZ Herald August 2013
 Heritage et AL : St James Theatre

Cinemas in New Zealand
Theatres in Auckland
Theatres completed in 1928
Heritage New Zealand Category 1 historic places in the Auckland Region
1928 establishments in New Zealand
1920s architecture in New Zealand
Auckland CBD